Valea Ursului River may refer to the following rivers in Romania:

 Valea Ursului, tributary of the Cerna in Hunedoara County
 Valea Ursului, tributary of the Homorod in Brașov County
 Valea Ursului, tributary of the Lotrioara in Sibiu County
 Valea Ursului, tributary of the Novăț in Maramureș County
 Valea Ursului, tributary of the Păscoaia in Vâlcea County
 Valea Ursului, tributary of the Râul Târgului in Argeș County

Others 
 Valea Urșilor or Padina Urșilor, tributary of the Bârsa River
 Valea Urșilor, tributary of the Negraș in Prahova County

See also 
 Valea Ursului (disambiguation)
 Ursu River (disambiguation)